Putative sodium-coupled neutral amino acid transporter 10, also known as solute carrier family 38 member 10, is a protein that in humans is encoded by the SLC38A10 gene.

Model organisms 

Model organisms have been used in the study of SLC38A10 function. A conditional knockout mouse line, called Slc38a10tm1a(EUCOMM)Wtsi was generated as part of the International Knockout Mouse Consortium program — a high-throughput mutagenesis project to generate and distribute animal models of disease to interested scientists.

Male and female animals underwent a standardized phenotypic screen to determine the effects of deletion. Twenty four tests were carried out on mutant mice and four significant abnormalities were observed. Homozygous animals of both sex had decreased body weights, and DEXA analysis showed that this correlated with decreased bone mineral content and decreased body length. Indirect calorimetry analysis showed that males displayed increased oxygen consumption and energy expenditure, while clinical chemistry tests found that females had decreased circulating amylase levels and males had hypoalbuminemia and increased circulating creatinine levels.

Cellular localization 

Cellular localization study of SLC38A10 protein was investigated on different cell lines and primary cortex neuronal cells  using Immunocytochemistry and GFP SLC38A10 vector. SLC38A10 localized on Golgi apparatus and ER organelles.

Recent study on SLC38A10 knockout model provided some insight on possible association with p53 protein and cell survival.

Cancer 
A SLC38A family member has been observed progressively downregulated in Human papillomavirus-positive neoplastic keratinocytes derived from uterine cervical preneoplastic lesions at different levels of malignancy. For this reason, SLC38A is likely to be associated with tumorigenesis and may be a potential prognostic marker for uterine cervical preneoplastic lesions progression.

References

Further reading 
 
 

Solute carrier family
Genes mutated in mice